Usability inspection is the name for a set of methods where an evaluator inspects a user interface. This is in contrast to usability testing where the usability of the interface is evaluated by testing it on real users. Usability inspections can generally be used early in the development process by evaluating prototypes or specifications for the system that can't be tested on users. Usability inspection methods are generally considered to be less costly to implement than testing on users.

Usability inspection methods include:

 Cognitive walkthrough (task-specific)
 Pluralistic walkthrough
 Heuristic evaluation (general) or (domain or culture-specific  )
Action Analysis
 Guideline scoring or testing

References

See also
 Heuristic evaluation
 Comparison of usability evaluation methods